Kelvin Davis (born May 26, 1978) is an American boxer. He is a former IBF cruiserweight champion.

Known as "Concrete", Davis, a compact pressure fighter, turned pro in 1999. He was undefeated in his first 20 fights, including a draw with veteran David Vedder (record 21-19-3) in 2001 and a points win over 37-year-old Ex IBF-titleholder Arthur Williams. He lost for the first time to little-known Ravea Springs (24-2).

In 2003 he got an IBF-eliminator fight against O'Neil Bell, who knocked him out.

Unimpressed by these losses the IBF put him in another eliminator with another Don King-fighter in Louis Azille. He won the fight by close decision.

In 2004 he won the vacant IBF title against hard-punching but chinny southpaw Ezra Sellars but never defended it.

In 2005 he lost by KO to Guillermo Jones and on points to undefeated Steve Cunningham.

He drew with heavyweight Charles Shufford in 2006 but was KOd by puncher Darnell Wilson in 2007.

Injury
While training for a heavyweight bout against Shane Cameron, Davis suffered an injury while on a training run in June 2007, jumping over Auckland's Greenhithe bridge to avoid a car.  Davis was forced to spend the next month in New Zealand after being hospitalized with a broken neck & broken back in two places.  After 11 hours of surgery, Davis began recovering, and many speculated that his boxing future was in doubt.  However, he fully recovered and returned to the ring four months later against undefeated heavy weight Carl Davis Drummond.

Recovery
Davis recovered from his injury and returned to the ring in November 2007. He lost a decision to undefeated Carl Davis Drumond. Davis was winless in his last eight bouts, including suffering first round knockouts to Eric Fields and Alexander Frenkel.

Retirement
Davis retired live on ESPN2's Friday Night Fights on January 18, 2008, after his TKO loss to prospect Eric Fields.

Professional boxing record

See also
List of cruiserweight boxing champions

References

External links
 
Homepage

1978 births
Living people
Cruiserweight boxers
World cruiserweight boxing champions
International Boxing Federation champions
Boxers from Mississippi
Sportspeople from Natchez, Mississippi
American male boxers
African-American boxers
21st-century African-American sportspeople
20th-century African-American sportspeople